Gut or guts may refer to:

Anatomy 
 Abdomen or belly, the region of a vertebrate between the chest and pelvis
 Abdominal obesity or "a gut", a large deposit of belly fat
 Gastrointestinal tract or gut, the system of digestive organs
 Insect digestive system
 Lower gastrointestinal tract or guts, the intestines
 To "gut" an animal is part of the butchery process

Geography and places

 Gut (coastal geography), a narrow coastal body of water
 Gut (Crișul Alb), a river in Romania
 Gut River, Jamaica
 Spring Run (West Branch Susquehanna River), also known as The Gut
 The Gut (geological feature), a conservation area east of Apsley, Ontario, Canada

People
 Gut (surname), list of people named Gut or Guts

Arts, entertainment, and media

Film and television 
 Guts (2009 film), a Spanish crime drama
 Guts (1999 film), a Dutch comedy
 "Guts" (The Walking Dead), a season 1 episode of the television series The Walking Dead
 Nickelodeon GUTS, a weekly half-hour sports game show which aired on Nickelodeon from 1992 to 1995

Games 
 Guts (card game), a poker variant
 Guts (flying disc game), a team flying disc game, similar to dodgeball
 The Guts!, a series of eroge video games

Literature 
Guts (Berserk), the protagonist of Kentaro Miura's manga series
 Gut (journal), of the British Society of Gastroenterology
 Guts (Robert A. Lutz book), a 2003 management guidebook by Robert A. Lutz, former CEO of Chrysler
 The Guts (novel), a 2013 novel by Roddy Doyle set in Ireland
 Guts (graphic novel), a 2019 graphic novel by Raina Telgemeier
 "Guts", a short story by Chuck Palahniuk from his 2005 book Haunted
 Guts, a 1985 suspense novel by Richard Laymon

Music 
 GUT (band), a German goregrind band
 Gut Records, an independent UK record label
 Guts (John Cale album), 1977
 Guts (McPhee, Brötzmann, Kessler, and Zerang album), 2007
 Guts!, a song by Arashi
 The Guts, American band in which Geoff Useless performed vocals

Schools 
 Gdańsk University of Technology, Poland
 Georgetown University Transportation Shuttle, US
 Graz University of Technology, Austria
 Groningen University Theatre Society
 Gujarat University of Transplantation Sciences, India

Other uses 
 Gut (ritual), Korean shamanistic rites
 Catgut, a type of cord used for instrumental strings
 Grand Unified Theory, a particle physics model
 A "gut feeling" may refer to intuition or a visceral emotional reaction 
 Gut spread, an options trading strategy in finance
 Maléku language (ISO 639-3 code: gut), spoken in Costa Rica

See also 
 
 
 The Guts (disambiguation)